Craig Evans may refer to:
 Craig Evans (Australian footballer) (born 1965), Australian rules footballer who played in the VFL
 Craig Evans (Zimbabwean sportsman) (born 1969), Zimbabwean cricketer and rugby union footballer
 Craig Evans (Welsh cricketer) (born 1971), former Welsh cricket batsman
 Craig A. Evans (born 1952), Canadian biblical scholar
 Craig Evans (boxer) (born 1989), Welsh boxer
 Craig Evans (referee) (born 1991), Welsh rugby union referee
 Lawrence Craig Evans (born 1949), American mathematician